The discography of Camila, a Mexican pop-soft rock group, consists of two studio albums, eight singles and six music videos.

Albums

Studio albums

Live albums

Compilation albums

Singles

As featured artist

Music videos

References

Latin pop music discographies
Discographies of Mexican artists